Jenny Lidback (born 30 March 1963) is a professional golfer.

Lidback was born in Lima, Peru to Swedish parents. She attended Texas Christian University and Louisiana State University.

Lidback's rookie season on the LPGA Tour was 1989. Her only win on the Tour came in 1995 at one of the major championships, the du Maurier Ltd. Classic. She had her best finish on the money list in the same year, placing 21st. She retired from tournament golf after the 2003 season.

Lidback became a U.S. citizen in May 2003. Her nephew, Roberto Castro, plays on the PGA Tour.

Professional wins (9)

LPGA Tour wins (1)

LPGA Tour playoff record (0–1)

Futures Tour wins (8)
1986 (1) Cape Coral Classic
1987 (3) Paradise Island Classic, Spring Valley Lake Classic, Oronoque Village Classic
1988 (4) Cheval Classic, Imperial Lakes Classic, Lake Eufaula Classic, Bob Barbour Toyota Classic

Major championships

Wins (1)

Team appearances
Professional
Handa Cup (representing World team): 2008, 2009, 2010, 2011, 2012 (tie), 2013 (winners), 2014, 2015

References

External links

American female golfers
LPGA Tour golfers
Winners of LPGA major golf championships
Sportspeople from Lima
Peruvian emigrants to the United States
Peruvian people of Swedish descent
American people of Swedish descent
1963 births
Living people
21st-century American women